Sharps Run is a stream in the U.S. state of West Virginia. It is a tributary of Cow Creek.

Sharps Run bears the name of a pioneer settler.

References

Rivers of Pleasants County, West Virginia
Rivers of West Virginia